Baba Salehi (also Romanized as Bābā Şāleḩī) is a village in Doshman Ziari Rural District, Doshman Ziari District, Mamasani County, Fars Province, Iran. At the 2006 census, its population was 324, in 63 families.

References 

Populated places in Mamasani County